Bessho Tameike is an earthfill dam located in Akita Prefecture in Japan. The dam is used for irrigation. The catchment area of the dam is 2.6 km2. The dam impounds about 3  ha of land when full and can store 212 thousand cubic meters of water. The construction of the dam was and completed in 1957.

References

Dams in Akita Prefecture
1957 establishments in Japan